Decachorda pomona is a species of moth of the family Saturniidae first described by Gustav Weymer in 1892. It is known from central and eastern Africa.

The forewings are reddish yellow with a white spot surrounded by brown in the middle. A fine brown line crosses its forewing.

References

Saturniidae
Moths described in 1892
Lepidoptera of the Democratic Republic of the Congo
Lepidoptera of Uganda
Lepidoptera of Malawi
Lepidoptera of Tanzania
Lepidoptera of Zambia
Lepidoptera of Zimbabwe
Moths of Sub-Saharan Africa